Valley is a low area between hills.

Valley may also refer to:

Places

Canada
Valley, Nova Scotia

Germany
Valley, Bavaria

United States
Valley, Alabama
Valley, Nebraska
Valley, New Jersey
Valley, Ohio
Valley, Providence, Rhode Island, a neighborhood
Valley, Washington
Valley, West Virginia
Valley, Wisconsin
Valley Creek (Pennsylvania), a tributary of the Schuylkill River in Pennsylvania
Valley Mountains, of Utah

Wales
Valley, Anglesey

People
Alvin Valley, American fashion designer
Dylan Valley, South African film producer
F. Wayne Valley (1914–1986), American businessman, original part-owner and managing partner of the Oakland Raiders
Mark Valley (born 1964), American actor
Paul Michael Valley (born 1966), American actor

Arts, entertainment, and media
Valley (band), a Canadian indie pop band
Valley (video game), a first-person adventure game
The Big Valley, an American Western television series (1965–1969)
Valley Records, a record label

Brands and enterprises
Valley-Dynamo LLC
Valley Co., an American manufacturer of pool tables; now a subsidiary of Valley-Dynamo LLC

Other uses
Valley girl, a socio-economic classification
Valleyspeak or Valspeak, an American sociolect primarily associated with Valley girls
Valley railway station, Wales

See also
Vallay
The Valley (disambiguation)
Valley Center (disambiguation)
Valley City (disambiguation)
Valley County (disambiguation)
Valley Township (disambiguation)
Valley View (disambiguation)